The Faculty of Social Sciences (FSS) is one of the newest faculties of Charles University. The Faculty was founded in 1990, shortly after the Velvet Revolution. It soon became a regional centre of teaching and research in area studies, economics, international relations, journalism, media studies, sociology and political science. The Faculty offers bachelor’s, master’s, and doctoral degree programs in social sciences. While the languages of instruction are Czech and English, students can choose from classes in a wide range of other languages, including French, German, Russian and Spanish.

The Faculty enrolls around 4,000 full-time students. Approximately 150 are enrolled in one of the English language degree programs.

Organisation of study 
Studies at the Faculty of Social Sciences are intended to prepare students for a professional career in the private sector, public administration, national governments, European institutions, academic research or the media. They are divided into three individual cycles: 
 A bachelor's degree cycle (3 years; Bc., equivalent to a BA)
 A master's degree cycle (2 years; Mgr., equivalent to an MA)
 Doctoral studies (4 years; Ph.D.)

Degree programs 
The Faculty offers degree programs at all levels in its subject specializations in both Czech and English. The English language degree programs offer one fully accredited English language bachelor´s degree program, ten fully accredited English language master's degree programs, and two double-degree programs in partnership with universities in London and Strasbourg.

 Bachelor in Economics and Finance (BEF) offers training in mathematics, statistics and econometrics. It covers key fields of economics and finance, mostly through courses surveying recent theory and empirics.
 Balkan, Eurasian and Central European Studies (BECES) offers versatile exploration of “the East”, understood as a territory composed of Central Europe, the Balkan Peninsula and Post- Soviet areas.
 Central European Comparative Studies (CECS) focuses on  Germany, Austria and the Visegrád Countries (the Czech Republic, Slovakia, Poland and Hungary) with an overlap onto neighboring regions.
 Corporate Finance and Strategy (CFS) is a two-year English-language Master's double-degree program with the University of Strasbourg aiming at providing students with a broad knowledge and understanding of economic theory with a focus on financial and international economics. 
 European Studies (ES) focuses on the study of Europe and on the European integration process in all its complexity and variety.
 Geopolitical Studies (GPS) seeks to explore the dynamic relationship between international politics and human geography, focusing on essential theories, thinkers and regions.
 International Economic and Political Studies (IEPS) offers a multidisciplinary investigation of contemporary political, economic and social issues.
 International Masters in Economy, State and Society (IMESS) in partnership with UCL School of Slavonic and East European Studies. The program offers three distinct study tracks, reflecting the unique multidisciplinary expertise of the consortium institutions.
 Master in International Security Studies (MISS) offers students a tour through security, conflict and strategic studies in the context of international relations.
 Master in Economics and Finance (MEF) gives the student a thorough grounding in both theoretical and applied economics.
 Public and Social Policy (PSP) provides students with relevant knowledge of policy-making process and cultivate their analytical skills. The program offers deeper knowledge in concrete policy domains such as social policy, health policy, educational policy, employment policy or others.
 Sociology in European Context (SEC) is a program designed for international students interested in gaining in-depth knowledge of the state of the present-day field including its theory and research methods.
 Transatlantic Studies (TS) aims to provide English speaking students with deep, interdisciplinary knowledge of transatlantic relations since 1945. The program gives a Central European perspective on transatlantic relations.

Other programs 
The Faculty offers summer school programs to its students, visiting students and the general public. For international students, the Faculty organizes Spring University Prague and Summer University Prague each April and September. This program is intended for students who are enrolled in a college or university or have recently graduated. It is open to approximately 30 students from across the world.

Admissions 
The application deadline for English language degree programs is April 15. In general, applications must include: completed application form, copies of all relevant diplomas and transcripts, short academic resume detailing and all relevant qualifications and experience. Students who are not native speakers should include details of any tests of the English language they have taken. Undergraduate students applying to graduate programs must hold a bachelor diploma in a related field of study.

Scholarships and funding 
 Scholarships for Students from Developing and Transition Countries administered directly by the Faculty of Social Sciences
 Czech Government Scholarships for Developing Countries
 International Visegrad Fund (IVF) Scholarships
 Erasmus Mundus External Cooperation Window Lot 3 Scholarships for Students from Israel and Palestine

International mobility 
The Faculty has one of the highest international mobility participation rates of all the faculties of Charles University. Each year it welcomes around 500 exchange students.

International mobility at the Faculty is mainly based on the European Higher Education Area which is coordinated by the Bologna Process. Its most visible demonstration is the ERASMUS Programme. In addition to the Erasmus Programme, the Faculty participates in other smaller student exchange programs, such as Erasmus Mundus, CEEPUS or AKTION. The Faculty is also intensively developing international cooperation beyond the framework of the European programs. This includes the maintenance of or entering into new cooperation with partner universities in North America, Asia and the Middle East.

Institutes 
 Institute of Economic Studies (IES) offers education in economics and finance at a level comparable to the leading universities in Europe.
 Institute of Communication Studies and Journalism (ICSJ) carries out scientific and research activities in the fields of media studies, journalism, marketing communication and public relations.
 Institute of International Studies (IIS) focuses on multidisciplinary research and area studies of North America, Europe and Eurasia.
 Institute of Political Studies (IPS) offers a fully-fledged university education in political science, international relations and security studies.
 Institute of Sociological Studies (ISS) provides education and develops scientific research in the fields of sociology, social and public policy and social anthropology.

Other parts of the Faculty 
 Centre for Media Studies (CEMES)
 Centre for Social and Economic Strategies (CESES)
 Department of Foreign Languages
 Scientific Information Centre
 Centre for Information Technology

Notable academics and alumni

Academics 
 Václav Moravec (Institute of Communication Studies and Journalism) – one of the most popular and influential Czech journalists; his Sunday political talk show, Otázky Václava Moravce, draws nearly 750,000 viewers each week
 Miroslav Novák (Institute of Political Studies) – one of the founders of political science in the Czech Republic and a key figure in the field
 Miloslav Petrusek (Institute of Sociological Studies) – former Dean of the Faculty; a doyen of Czech sociology
 Lenka Rovná (Institute of International Studies) – a recipient of the title Jean Monnet Chair Ad Personam, established by the European Commission to award top professors in European Studies
 Zdeněk Tůma (Institute of Economic Studies) – former Governor of the Czech National Bank

Alumni 
 Petr Just – political scientist
 Barbora Kroužková – moderator
 Tomáš Pojar – diplomat, former deputy minister of foreign affairs of the Czech Republic, Czech ambassador in Israel (since 2010)
 Tomáš Sedláček – economist, Chief Macroeconomic Strategist at ČSOB, the largest Czech bank
 Pavel Žáček – former director of the Institute for the Study of Totalitarian Regimes
 Robert Záruba – commentator at Czech Television and lecturer at the Faculty of Social Sciences, Charles University in Prague, in journalism

References

External links 
 
 Institute of Economic Studies
 Institute of International Studies
 Department of American Studies
 Department of International Relations
 Centre for Social and economic Strategies
 Centre for Social and economic Summer University Prague

Charles University
1990 establishments in Czechoslovakia
Educational institutions established in 1990